Edward Norman Eisenberg (July 5, 1879 – April 14, 1951) was an American football coach.  He served as the head football coach at Allegheny College in Meadville, Pennsylvania. He held that position for the 1901 season. His coaching record at Allegheny was 6–5–1.

References

1879 births
1951 deaths
Allegheny Gators football coaches
Lafayette College alumni
People from Norristown, Pennsylvania